"Person to Person" is the series finale of the American television drama series Mad Men and the 92nd episode of the series overall. The episode was written and directed by series creator Matthew Weiner, and originally aired on AMC on May 17, 2015.

Plot

In the fall of 1970, Don calls Sally from Utah, where he's witnessed Gary Gabelich's Blue Flame break the land speed record at the Bonneville Speedway. Sally gives Don the news about Betty's cancer diagnosis and states her opinion that Bobby and Gene should stay with Henry Francis after their mother's death, as this will allow them to stay in the same school, same house, and have the same friends. Phoning Betty next, Don implores her to have his children live with him. However, Betty insists she wants them to live with her brother and his wife, stating they need stability and "a woman in their lives," things that Don cannot provide. Making his way further west to California, Don reunites with Anna Draper's niece Stephanie, who has left her child to be raised with his paternal grandmother. Don tries to give her Anna Draper's wedding ring, which she had left to Don, who had used it to propose to Megan. Megan returned it after the divorce. Stephanie rejects the gift, seeing no point. She is about to leave for an Esalen-like, oceanside spiritual retreat further up the state's coastline, and takes Don with her.

Meanwhile, as Joan and Richard begin planning their new life together, she receives a business opportunity from her old colleague Ken Cosgrove. She then offers Peggy a partnership in a film production company she is starting. She considers it and even discusses it with Stan, who tells her that her current job is a better fit, which leads to them arguing.

Richard is displeased with Joan's professional ambition and leaves—it doesn't fit in with his plans for them. Some time later, Roger visits and tells Joan that his daughter Margaret is now "lost"  and he is going to completely cut her out of his will, leaving his estate to his grandson Ellery and Kevin, who doesn't know Roger is his father. Joan reveals to Roger that Greg has no contact or relationship with Kevin, and that it will actually be something of a relief to know that Kevin's future will be provided for. Roger tells her that he's going to marry Megan's mother, Marie Calvet, and Joan laughs, delighted by the scandal.

Back at the Francis residence, Sally has returned home from boarding school, ostensibly because she missed Bobby and Gene. Bobby reveals he knows about Betty's cancer, and knows that Sally has really returned to take care of him and Gene because their mother is going to die soon. Noticing that Bobby has burned his grilled cheese, Sally offers to show him how to do it properly, and she commences being the woman of the house.

Later at the retreat, Stephanie abandons Don after receiving troubling criticism in group therapy about "abandoning" her child with his paternal grandparents. Stuck at the retreat with no means of leaving for several days, a distraught Don calls Peggy in her office. Peggy pleads for him to return home and to his job, insisting McCann Erickson would gladly take him back and there is work to be done with the Coca-Cola account. In despair and on the verge of a breakdown, Don confesses many of his wrongdoings to Peggy: stealing another man's name, breaking all of his vows and scandalizing Sally, believing that he's done nothing truly substantial in his life, and confiding that the main reason he called was he never bid her goodbye. Peggy replies, "That's not true," and tries again to convince him to come home.

After Don hangs up, Peggy discusses the disturbing call with Stan over the phone. Though Peggy is concerned for her mentor, Stan reasons that Don has disappeared off the radar many times before and always returns. She apologizes for their earlier argument, and Stan tells her that he is in love with Peggy. Peggy initially is flustered, but suddenly realizes she loves him too. He then rushes to her office where they kiss.

A counselor at the retreat notices that Don is upset and persuades him to attend a group therapy session she is on her way to. During the meeting Don sees a fellow attendee, Leonard (Evan Arnold), confess to feeling unloved and overlooked by his family and colleagues. Leonard describes a dream where he is an item in a refrigerator that no one selects; he then breaks down crying. Don, overcome with emotion, embraces him and breaks down as well.

The episode (and the series as a whole) ends with a montage of the fates of the major characters: Pete, Trudy and Tammy board a Learjet taking them to their new lives in Wichita. Joan operates her thriving new business, Holloway Harris Productions, from her apartment while her mother looks after her son. Roger and Marie sit in a cafe in Paris on their honeymoon and muse about an elderly couple seated nearby. Sally does housework and tends to her younger brothers, while Betty smokes a cigarette and reads behind her. Peggy, hard at work on an assignment, receives a loving embrace from Stan. Don, seated in the lotus position, participates in a meditation class at the retreat center when a smile comes to his face. The show smash cuts to the groundbreaking 1971 "Hilltop" television advertisement for Coca-Cola.

Reception

Critical reception
The finale received a 92% rating at Rotten Tomatoes with an average score of 8.7 out of 10 based on 52 reviews. The site's consensus reads, "'Person to Person' shoulders the burden of concluding a masterpiece by avoiding predictability while still offering a sweet sendoff for most of Mad Mens main characters." The episode, however, also inspired diverse reactions from critics.

Maureen Ryan of The Huffington Post felt that "some past season finales were more satisfying and resonant than the series finale was" but felt the ending for Stan and Peggy was great. Alan Sepinwall of HitFix felt the Stan and Peggy aspect, while "as sappy and wish-fullfillment-y as Mad Men has ever gotten", was "a fair way to end things" for her character. At the same time he expressed concern that Don's ending might well be "a very cynical and dark take on a man I wanted better from." Although Megan Garber of The Atlantic found Don's ending "a pleasant shock". John Teti of The A.V. Club gave the episode a perfect "A" grade.

Evan Arnold's brief role as Leonard and his "refrigerator" speech also received notice and praise.

Ratings
The original broadcast on May 17, 2015, was watched by an estimated 3.287 million viewers.

Ending interpretation
The series finale ends with Don Draper meditating on a hilltop and cuts to the iconic 1971 "Hilltop" television advertisement for Coca-Cola, which leaves viewers to interpret whether Don created the ad. In real life, the ad was created by Bill Backer of McCann Erickson — the agency for which Don works at the time of the finale.

Many critics interpret the ending as the commercial having been created by Don, as does actor Jon Hamm. Both McCann Erickson and Coca-Cola interpret that Don created the ad. Critics also have noted similarities between the woman working at the commune where Don stays in the finale and a woman in the Coke commercial. Other critics say writer-creator Matthew Weiner left it deliberately ambiguous, with Sonia Saraiya of Salon.com encapsulating it as: 

Series creator and episode writer Matthew Weiner said in an interview after the finale:

Weiner also said of the ending: "We leave everybody slightly improved."

Accolades
Matthew Weiner was nominated for the Primetime Emmy Award for Outstanding Writing for a Drama Series and the episode received four further nominations in technical categories. Both Jon Hamm and Elisabeth Moss submitted this episode in consideration for their Primetime Emmy Award nominations for Outstanding Lead Actor and Outstanding Lead Actress in a Drama Series, respectively. Hamm won the award at the 67th Primetime Emmy Awards ceremony on September 20, 2015, after being nominated eight consecutive times. Weiner was nominated for the Writers Guild of America Award for Television: Episodic Drama for this episode. Weiner was also nominated for the Directors Guild of America Award for Outstanding Directing – Drama Series at the 68th Directors Guild of America Awards.

References

External links
 "Person to Person" at AMC
 

2015 American television episodes
Mad Men (season 7) episodes
American television series finales